Holly Hughes may refer to:

 Holly Hughes (politician) (born 1957), Republican politician from Michigan
 Holly Hughes (performance artist) (born 1955), performance artist (half Sri Lankan)